The 2021 season is the Wild Aces' inaugural season in the Fan Controlled Football League (FCFL). They went on to finish the regular season 2–2. Ladarius Galloway won the regular season Offensive MVP and Joseph Putu won the Defensive MVP.

They faced the Zappers in the Semifinals and won the game 32–6, allowing them to advance to the championship. The Aces won The People's Championship v1.0 against the Glacier Boyz 36–30. Ed Crouch won the People's Championship Gatorade MVP award. They would finish the entire season 4–2.

Staff

Final roster

Regular season

Schedule

Game summaries

Week 1: vs. Glacier Boyz

Week 2: vs. Beasts

Week 3: vs. Zappers

Week 4: vs. Glacier Boyz

Postseason

Schedule

Game summaries

Semifinals: vs. (3) Zappers

People's Championship v1.0: vs. (4) Glacier Boyz

End of the season

Standings

Records established
Since it was the franchise's first season these statistics are the records set by players for Season v1.0.

Awards

References

Wild Aces